Gulkevichi is a town and the administrative center of Gulkevichsky District of Krasnodar Krai, Russia, located  northeast of Krasnodar. Population: 34,272 people (2020),

History
It appeared as a settlement at the Gulkevichi station, opened in 1875 (the name is based on the location of the station on the land owned by the councilor N. V. Gulkevichu). Town status was granted to it in 1961.

Administrative and municipal status
Within the framework of administrative divisions, Gulkevichi serves as the administrative center of Gulkevichsky District. As an administrative division, it is, together with two rural localities, incorporated within Gulkevichsky District as the Town of Gulkevichi. As a municipal division, the Town of Gulkevichi is incorporated within Gulkevichsky Municipal District as Gulkevichskoye Urban Settlement.

Notable people
 
 
Andronik Karagezyan (born 1974), former Russian professional football player

References

Notes

Sources

External links

Official website of Gulkevichi 
Gulkevichi Business Directory  

Cities and towns in Krasnodar Krai
Gulkevichsky District
Populated places established in 1871
1871 establishments in the Russian Empire